1000 Faces may refer to:
 1,000 Faces, an EP by Randy Montana
 1000 Faces, an album by Jason Ross